Anke Preuß (born 22 September 1992) is a German footballer who plays as a goalkeeper for SV Meppen. She previously played for FCR 2001 Duisburg, TSG 1899 Hoffenheim, 1. FFC Frankfurt, AGSM Verona Calcio, Sunderland and Liverpool.

Club career

Hoffenheim (2012–2013)
On 10 May 2012, Preuß signed with TSG 1899 Hoffenheim.  She made a total of 19 appearances in all competitions.

Frankfurt (2013–2016)
On 11 July 2013, Preuß left Hoffenheim and signed a two-year contract with 1. FFC Frankfurt.

Verona (2016)
On 28 July 2016, Preuß signed with AGSM Verona Calcio. She only made one appearance for the club, in a 3–1 away win over Jesina on 1 October.

Sunderland (2017–2018)
On 14 February 2017, Preuß joined Sunderland. On 19 March 2017, she made her debut in a 3–2 home victory against Aston Villa in the fifth round of the 2016–17 FA Women's Cup.

Liverpool (2018–2020)
On 10 July 2018, Preuß signed with Liverpool and was given the number 1 shirt.

She left the club at the end of the 2019—2020 season, having made 31 appearances, after the Merseyside club was relegated to the Women's Championship.

International career
Preuß was part of the under-20 team that finished in second place at the 2012 FIFA U-20 Women's World Cup.

Honours
1899 Hoffenheim
 2. Frauen-Bundesliga: 2012–13

1. FFC Frankfurt
 DFB-Pokal: 2013–14
 UEFA Women's Champions League: 2014–15

References

External links

 
 
 
 Anke Preuß at DFB Datencenter

Living people
1992 births
People from Ratingen
Sportspeople from Düsseldorf (region)
Footballers from North Rhine-Westphalia
German women's footballers
Women's association football goalkeepers
Frauen-Bundesliga players
Women's Super League players
Serie A (women's football) players
FCR 2001 Duisburg players
TSG 1899 Hoffenheim (women) players
1. FFC Frankfurt players
A.S.D. AGSM Verona F.C. players
Sunderland A.F.C. Ladies players
Liverpool F.C. Women players
German expatriate women's footballers
German expatriate sportspeople in Italy
Expatriate women's footballers in Italy
German expatriate sportspeople in England
Expatriate women's footballers in England